Lawn bowls women's triples at the 2018 Commonwealth Games was held at the Broadbeach Bowls Club in the Gold Coast, Australia from April 9 to 12. A total of 54 athletes from 18 associations participated in the event.

Sectional play
The top two from each section advance to the knockout stage.

Section A

Section B

Section C

Section D

Knockout stage

External links
Results

References

Women's triples
Comm